Faqih Mahalleh (also Romanized as Faqīh Maḩalleh) is a village in Goli Jan Rural District, in the Central District of Tonekabon County, Mazandaran Province, Iran. According to the 2006 census, the population was 240 people within 75 families.

References 

Populated places in Tonekabon County